Princess Luise of Anhalt-Bernburg (30 October 1799 – 9 December 1882), also known as Princess Friedrich of Prussia (after her husband, Prince Friedrich of Prussia) was a German princess.

As the daughter of Alexius Frederick Christian, Duke of Anhalt-Bernburg and his wife Marie Friederike of Hesse-Kassel, she was a princess of Anhalt-Bernburg and member of the House of Ascania. By her 21 November 1817 marriage to Prince Frederick of Prussia she was a princess of Prussia.
She had two children: Prince Alexander of Prussia (21 June 1820, Berlin – 4 January 1896, Berlin) and Prince George of Prussia (12 February 1826, Düsseldorf – 2 May 1902, Berlin).

References

1799 births
1882 deaths
House of Ascania
Prussian princesses
German princesses
Daughters of monarchs